Patancheru is located in the north western end of Hyderabad. It is an industrial zone located about 32 km from the city centre on the Hyderabad-Solapur highway, and around 18 km from HITEC City. Earlier, it was the headquarters of Bidar and Gulshanabad revenue divisions. Mettu Kumar Yadav is the elected Corporator for Patancheru Division. It has a number of temples built between 12th and 15th centuries. Patancheru is home to ICRISAT, and many pharmaceutical manufacturers, which has resulted in the local river water being the most drug polluted water in the world.

Etymology
Patancheru, also known as Pathan Cheru.

Geography 
It has an average elevation of 522 metres (1712 feet). Saki Lake is situated very close to the Patancheru Bus Terminus.

Demographics 
 India census, Patancheru had a population of 40,332. Males constitute 53% of the population and females 47%. Patancheru has an average literacy rate of 65%, higher than the national average of 59.5%.  Male literacy is 73%, and female literacy is 57%. In Patancheru, 14% of the population is under 6 years of age.

Education 
There are a number of educational institutions in Patancheru, including the following:
 ICRISAT
 GITAM University Hyderabad Campus (Rudraram village, Patancheru)
 TRR College of Engineering (INOLE, Patancheru)
 Maheshwara Engineering College
 Maheshwara Institute Of Technology
 zeal computers
 Sri Vani High School
 St. Josephs High School
 RRS College of Engineering and Technology, Muthangi, Patancheru
 Ellenki College of Engineering and Technology - Patelguda
 Manjeera High School
 Geeta Public School
 krishnaveni Talent School
 Amaltas Green School, Indresam, Patancheru

Banks 
There are a number of Banks in Patancheru, including the following:

State Bank of India
Andhra Bank
Axis Bank Ltd
Andhra Pradesh Grameena Vikas Bank
Punjab National Bank
Kotak Mahindra Bank
Sahara India Pariwar
UCO Bank
Central Bank of India
IDBI Bank
Bank of Baroda
ICICI Bank

Electoral governance
Members of Legislative Assembly or MLAs
Shri  " Gudem Mahipal Reddy " is an Indian political activist who is the current member of the Telangana Legislative Assembly from Patancheru constituency.[2] He belongs to Telangana Rashtra Samithi. He won elections in year 2014 and 2018 General Elections.

Sports 
 Maithry Cricket Club

Theatres 
There are two theatres in Patancheru, including the following:
 Venkateswara Theatre

Industry 
Patancheru is the major industrial hub of Telangana. Companies such as Finecab, Biological.E, Ankit Packaging, Sandvik Asia, Agarwal Rubber Limited (makers of ARL & MARUTI brand of tyres & butyl tubes) and Asian Paints, Aurobindo Pharma, Paragon Polymer Products Pvt Ltd, hindware, Fenner, Pennar, Kirby Building Systems, Rotec Transmissions are located in this area. It received a major boost when Indira Gandhi started the Patancheru Industrial park, while serving as the MP of Medak constituency.

Patancheru is also home to several ecommerce companies, including: Amazon, Dmart, Grofers & Trent.

The highest level of drug pollution in water was found in Patancheru in 2009. Researchers found measurable quantities of 21 different manufactured drugs in the water. The pollution results from waste water dumped into the river by the over 90 local pharmaceutical manufacturers.

Political parties had promised that they were going to clean the lake in Patancheru as it was polluted with sewage and a mix of chemicals from the industries around it as the present and MLA and his TRS government had promised to make it drinkable.

References 

Neighbourhoods in Hyderabad, India